A Vision of Misery is the third full-length album by the thrash metal band Sadus, released in 1992.

Reissued by Displeased Records in 2007 with a bonus DVD, also reissued in January 2007 by Metal Mind Productions as a Deluxe digipak gold-disc edition with two bonus Demo tracks taken from the 1987 Demo album Certain Death Demo as well as liner notes.

Track listing

2006 reissue bonus tracks

2007 reissue bonus DVD
"Through the eyes of greed (Oakland '92 live)"
"Valley of dry bones (Oakland '92 live)"
"Facelift (Oakland '92 live)"
"Certain death (Oakland '92 live)"
"Deceptive perceptions (Oakland '92 live)"
"Hands of fate (Oakland '92 live)"
"Echoes of forever (Oakland '92 live)"
"Throwing away the day (Oakland '92 live)"
"Machines (Oakland '92 live)"
"In your face (Oakland '92 live)"
"Sadus attack (Oakland '92 live)"
"Slave to misery (Oakland '92 live)"
"Live clips and behind the scenes (NY '90)"

Credits
Darren Travis – guitar, Vocals
Rob Moore – guitar
Steve Di Giorgio – bass
Jon Allen – drums

The cover art was done by Jason Garvin, and the photos were done by Jeff Moore and Joe Giron. The drumkit used on the record was provided by John "Hexx" Shafer.

Charts

Monthly

References
  

Sadus albums
1992 albums
Roadrunner Records albums
Technical death metal albums